Liane the Wayfarer is a science fantasy short story by American writer Jack Vance, the fourth in his The Dying Earth series.  It first appeared in the December 1950 issue of the magazine Worlds Beyond. It is sometimes published under the  alternate title "The Loom of Darkness".

Plot summary
A vain, overconfident, utterly amoral adventurer who calls himself Liane the Wayfarer is traveling through the forest, contemplating a magic ring he has just found. The ring allows him to hide himself by stretching it into a hoop and lowering it over himself, transporting him into a mysterious world of complete darkness. Liane encounters a creature called a Twk-Man, tiny blue men who ride dragonflies and exchange gossip for tiny quantities of items such as salt. The Twk-Man tells Liane of a beautiful woman, a witch named Lith, who lives nearby. 

Liane travels to Lith's reed hut and immediately asks her to be his lover. Lith, seeing that Liane is a "bandit-troubadour" with fancy clothes and a handsome appearance with bright, golden eyes, responds that she will love him if he recovers for her the other half of a golden tapestry of Lith's homeland, Ariventa. It was stolen by a man or monster named Chun the Unavoidable, who hung it in a marble temple in the ruins of the ancient city of Kaiin. Liane, overconfident, immediately accepts her offer. Liane spends the next night in an inn in the civilized section of Kaiin, where the guests demonstrate magical wonders to one another. When Liane mentions the name of Chun the Unavoidable, the other guests are silent and depart for their rooms immediately, while Liane is demonstrating the ring's "magic from antique days".  Liane, oblivious, continues drinking.

The next morning, Liane asks an old man where to find Chun's lair. The old man sadly directs Liane to Chun's ruined temple, but warns Liane that many before him have failed and died. Liane ignores the warning, and giving it some thought, decides that the old man might be Chun's accomplice, and casually murders him.

Liane finds the tapestry in the temple, but when he pulls it down, Chun is directly behind it, wearing a robe studded with human eyeballs. Chun chases Liane out of the temple and into the streets, but Liane cannot escape. As a last resort, he pulls the ring over his head and enters the dark world. The last words he hears are "I am Chun the Unavoidable" from right behind him.

Later that night, Lith hears Chun's voice from outside her barred and shuttered hut. Chun tells her that he is leaving her two threads, because the eyes were so bright and golden. Later, Lith collects the threads and weaves them into her half of the tapestry. She then, weeping, says that when the tapestry is complete, she can go home to Ariventa.

References

1950 short stories
Dying Earth
Fantasy short stories
Works originally published in Worlds Beyond (magazine)